Pelverata is a rural locality in the local government areas (LGA) of Huon Valley and Kingborough in the South-east and Hobart LGA regions of Tasmania. The 2016 census recorded a population of 206 for the state suburb of Pelverata.
It is a town in Tasmania, Australia, to the east of Huonville. It is mainly in the Huon Valley Council area, with about 4% in the Kingborough Council LGA.

History
Pelverata was gazetted as a locality in 1968. Previously known as Upper Woodstock, the name was changed in 1912.
The name Pelverata is a Tasmanian Aboriginal word for "ear".

Geography
Most of the boundaries are survey lines.

Road infrastructure 
Route B621 (Pelverata Road) runs through from south-west to north-east.

Attractions
 Pelverata Falls

References

Towns in Tasmania
Localities of Huon Valley Council
Localities of Kingborough Council